Jason Cooper (born 16 February 1972) is an Australian former swimmer.

A butterfly and freestyle swimmer, Cooper began training around the age of eight and was a student at Brisbane State High School. In 1990 he was a member of the gold medal-winning  freestyle relay team at the Auckland Commonwealth Games and won a bronze medal in the 100 metres butterfly. He competed at the 1991 World Championships and made the B final of the 100 metres butterfly. In 1992 he missed selection for the Barcelona Olympic team by 0.05 seconds. He was a national title holder in the 50 metres butterfly, a non-Olympic event.

References

1972 births
Living people
Australian male freestyle swimmers
Australian male butterfly swimmers
Swimmers from Brisbane
People educated at Brisbane State High School
Commonwealth Games gold medallists for Australia
Commonwealth Games bronze medallists for Australia
Commonwealth Games medallists in swimming
Medallists at the 1990 Commonwealth Games
Swimmers at the 1990 Commonwealth Games